Monnie Tom Cheves (February 14, 1902 – August 14, 1988) was an American politician and professor. He served as a Democratic member of the Louisiana House of Representatives.

Cheves was the son of Miranda Hall and Thomas Taylor Cheves. Cheves attended Natchitoches Central High School, Louisiana State University and Northwestern State University, where he earned a bachelor's degree and a master's degree. He was a professor at Northwestern State University and Samford University, Dean of Education at Nocholla State College, assistant to the president of Chipola College and a football and basketball coach at Natchitoches High School.

In 1952 Cheves was elected to the Louisiana House of Representatives, serving until 1960.

Cheves died in August 1988 in Birmingham, Alabama, at the age of 86. He was buried in Fern Park Cemetery.

References

1902 births
1988 deaths
20th-century American politicians
American academics
American educators
Democratic Party members of the Louisiana House of Representatives
High school football coaches in Louisiana
High school basketball coaches in Louisiana
Natchitoches Central High School alumni
Northwestern State University alumni
Louisiana State University alumni
Northwestern State University faculty
Samford University faculty
People from Birmingham, Alabama
Politicians from Natchitoches, Louisiana
Sportspeople from Natchitoches, Louisiana
Burials in Louisiana